Charles Henry Hall (1851 – 4 November 1922) was an Australian politician.

He was born in Melbourne. In 1897 he was elected to the Tasmanian House of Assembly as the member for Waratah. In 1903 he stood for Burnie and was defeated, but in 1909 he was elected to the Tasmanian Legislative Council as the member for Russell. He was defeated in 1921 and died in Burnie the following year.

References

1851 births
1922 deaths
Independent members of the Parliament of Tasmania
Members of the Tasmanian House of Assembly
Members of the Tasmanian Legislative Council
Politicians from Melbourne